A parry is a fencing bladework maneuver intended to deflect or block an incoming attack.

Execution
To execute a parry, fencers strike the opponent's foible, or the area near the tip of the blade, with their forte, or the part of the blade near the bell guard (or handle) of the weapon. This deflects the opponent's blade away from them, protecting them and placing them in a good position to strike back. Approximations of the precise parries are made often during bouts, but are usually accurate enough to be classed as parries.

In épée, because of absence of priority rules (see right-of-way), a parry can be classed as any deflection of the blade that prevents the opponent's attack from landing.

Use
The primary function of a parry is to prevent an opponent's attack from landing. During a bout, parries are commenced from the "en garde" (neutral) position, when an opponent's attack is considered threatening. 

A parry is usually followed by a riposte, which is an attack back against the original attacker.  More advanced fencers can, instead of immediately riposting after successfully taking a parry, initiate a prise de fer ("taking of the blade") in which they move the opponent's blade to a different position and then hit them.

In foil and sabre, the rules governing the parry give it tactical significance as well: there is a rule known as priority, or "right-of-way."  The first fencer to commence an attack gains the priority.
If the attack results in a successful hit, only the fencer who has the priority is awarded a touch (regardless of whether the fencer without right of way has made a touch). A successful parry causes the attack to fail, and hence the priority is transferred to the defender (who is now the attacker). Taking a parry, therefore, means that the attacker is in an awkward position (with their arm extended and sometimes off-balance), having just committed to attacking, and the defender has the priority, as well as the best position to riposte, or strike after parrying.

Classification

There are eight parries in the classical systems of épée and foil fencing. Parries are classified based on three attributes: 1) The direction of the blade in relation to the hand: up or down. 2) The position of the blade in relation to the fencing line: inside or outside. 3) The rotation of the wrist in the hand holding the weapon: supinated (palm up) or pronated (palm down).

The parries are numbered from one to eight, with the numbers often referred to by the old French terms: prime, seconde, tierce, quarte, quinte, sixte, septième, octave.

For a right-handed fencer, the inside line is to the left, and the outside line is to the right; thus the parries prime, quarte, and  septime deflect the opponent's blade to the left (inside), while the parries seconde, tierce, sixte, and octave deflect the opponent's blade to the right (outside), as shown.

The phrase "counter-parry" indicates a parry that is done in response to an opponent's parry (that is, to block the riposte which follows up the opponent's parry.) This is not to be confused with the contra- (or "circular") parry, in which a semicircular motion is used to make a parry from the opposite side from the attack.

Because sabre parries defend against both cuts (attacks with the edge) as well as thrusts (attacks with the point), the sabre parries are slightly different from the corresponding épée or foil parries; most notably the parry 5 ("quinte"), which defends against a head cut in sabre (an attack that is not allowed in foil or épée).

References

Epee Fencing: A Complete System - Imre Vass (SKA Swordplay Books)
Know the Game: Fencing
Fencing: Techniques of Foil, Épée and Sabre - Brian Pitman
Theory, Methods and Exercises in Fencing - Ziemowit Wojciechowski

External links

British Fencing's Glossary of Terms

Fencing
Blade weapons